Aleksander Reichenberg (born June 13, 1992) is a Norwegian professional ice hockey forward currently playing for IK Oskarshamn in the Swedish Hockey League (SHL) and for the Norwegian national team.

Playing career
While born in Mora, Sweden, Reichenberg began his professional career with hometown club, Lillehammer IK in the GET-ligaen (GET) during the 2008–09 season.

After playing two seasons with rival club Storhamar Ishockey and moving abroad for the 2017–18 season with HC Sparta Praha of the Czech Extraliga (ELH), Reichenberg returned to Lillehammer on 1 September 2018.

In the 2018–19 season, Reichenberg compiled 12 points in just 10 games with Lillehammer before leaving on loan for the remainder of the season to join Swedish outfit, Färjestad BK of the SHL, on 16 December 2018. In a top 9 role, he added 4 goals and 7 points in 27 regular season games. In 9 playoff games, Reichenberg added 1 goal to help reach the semi-finals.

On 17 June 2019, Reichenberg opted to continue playing in the SHL, agreeing to a one-year contract with newly promoted club, IK Oskarshamn, for their maiden season in the top tier.

International play
Reichenberg participated for Norway at the 2017 IIHF World Championship.

Career statistics

Regular season and playoffs

International

References

External links

1992 births
Living people
People from Mora Municipality
Färjestad BK players
Lillehammer IK players
Ice hockey players at the 2018 Winter Olympics
Olympic ice hockey players of Norway
Norwegian ice hockey forwards
HC Sparta Praha players
Storhamar Dragons players
Sportspeople from Lillehammer
Norwegian people of Swedish descent
Graz 99ers players
Stjernen Hockey players
Norwegian expatriate sportspeople in Sweden
Norwegian expatriate sportspeople in the Czech Republic
Norwegian expatriate sportspeople in Austria
Expatriate ice hockey players in Sweden
Expatriate ice hockey players in Austria
Expatriate ice hockey players in the Czech Republic
Norwegian expatriate ice hockey people